The Wu-Wang-Zai-Ju Inscribed Rock is a rock at Mount Taiwu in Jinhu Township, Kinmen County, Taiwan.

History
After losing Mainland China at the end of Chinese Civil War in 1949, Chiang Kai-shek tried to set up strategies to retake back the mainland from the Communist Party of China. In 1952, he wished to make an inscription on a rock. General Hu Lien then tried to search for the ideal place to write such wordings. Once found, Chiang wrote four Chinese characters named  which means Do not forget the experience in Ju as a reminder to the Republic of China Armed Forces stationed in Kinmen. The words refer to the history of Tian Dan of the Qi State during the Warring States period.

Geology
The rock is located at the top of Mount Taiwu.

See also
 Geology of Taiwan

References

1952 establishments in Taiwan
Buildings and structures completed in 1952
Jinhu Township
Landforms of Kinmen County
Rock formations of Taiwan